Osman Hussain (also Hussain Osman or Hamdi Isaac) (born 27 July 1978) is a terrorist who was found guilty of having placed an explosive at the Shepherd's Bush tube station during the failed 21 July 2005 London bombings. Born in Ethiopia, Hussain is a naturalised British citizen married to Yeshshiemebet Girma.

On 29 July 2005, he was arrested during a 40-officer raid at his brother-in-law's apartment in Rome, after mobile phone calls led police to believe he was hiding there. He was later extradited to the UK in September under a European Arrest Warrant and charged with attempted murder. He stood trial along with five other suspects.

Claimed objectives 
During the initial investigation in Rome, Hussain said he was motivated to participate in the attacks after viewing videos of war-torn Iraq. "I am against war," Osman said. "I've marched in peace rallies and nobody listened to me. I never thought of killing people." He explained that the bombs were never meant to detonate or kill anybody, only to draw attention to the Iraq war.

Hussain was alleged to have stated: "More than praying we discussed work, politics, the war in Iraq ... we always had new films of the war in Iraq ... more than anything else those in which you could see Iraqi women and children who had been killed by US and UK soldiers."

Other news sources reported that the bombers watched videos of British and American troops killing women and children in Iraq before embarking on their mission.  Some quoted him as 
saying "Muktar showed us some DVDs with images of the war in Iraq, especially women and children killed by American and British soldiers," Hussain said, adding that they were not to talk about these videos with others.

"There was a feeling of hatred and conviction that it was necessary to give signal — to do something." Hussain denied links with either the Al-Qaeda or the 7 July bombers.  He claimed there was no bomb in his rucksack, just ordinary flour and a detonator meant to make the loud popping sound that was heard.

Trial and sentence
On 9 July 2007 Hussain Osman was found guilty at Woolwich Crown Court of conspiracy to murder and sentenced to a minimum of 40 years in prison.

Appeal 
In April 2008, the Court of Appeal judges dismissed a challenge by Ibrahim, Omar, Mohammed and Osman to their convictions.

In December 2014, the European Court of Human Rights rejected an appeal lodged in 2008 by Ibrahim, Omar and Mohammed claiming that their rights were breached in the 'safety interviews' after their arrests.

See also 
 Jean Charles de Menezes, who was killed by police after being mistaken for Hussain.
 Muktar Said Ibrahim
Yasin Hassan Omar
Ramzi Mohammed

References

External links 
 BBC News: "21 July Bombings Trial Portal"
 BBC News: "Charges in full"
 Sky News: "'Fourth bomb suspect' held in Rome"
 BBC News report: "'All four' July 21 suspects held"
 Associated Press: "London, Rome Arrest Suspected 7-21 Bombers"

July 2005 London bombings
Living people
Ethiopian emigrants to England
1978 births
Naturalised citizens of the United Kingdom
Perpetrators of the July 2005 London bombings
Prisoners and detainees of England and Wales
British prisoners and detainees
Prisoners sentenced to life imprisonment by England and Wales
People extradited from Italy
People extradited to the United Kingdom
British Islamists